The 1877 Huntingdonshire by-election was fought on 29 June 1877.  The byelection was fought due to the death of the incumbent Conservative MP, Henry Carstairs Pelly.  It was won by the Conservative candidate Viscount Mandeville.

References

1877 in England
1877 elections in the United Kingdom
Politics of Huntingdonshire
By-elections to the Parliament of the United Kingdom in Cambridgeshire constituencies
19th century in Huntingdonshire